Swisher is the surname of:
 Bella French Swisher (1837–1893), American writer
 Bob Swisher (1914–1979), American National Football League running back
 Clark Swisher (1916–2005), American football and basketball coach
 Clayton Swisher, American journalist and author currently working for Al Jazeera
 Gloria Wilson Swisher (born 1935), American composer, educator and pianist
 Joanna Garcia Swisher (born 1979), American actress, wife of Nick Swisher
 Joel Swisher (born 1943), American former college football head coach
 Kara Swisher (born 1962), journalist specializing in technology subjects
 Laura Swisher, actress and comedian
 Luis Swisher (born 1978), Guatemalan former footballer
 Nick Swisher (born 1980), Major League Baseball player
 Phil Swisher (born 1967), American guitarist
 Steve Swisher (born 1951), former Major League Baseball catcher and father of Nick